| enrolment_as_of = 2022
| grades      = 9–12
| grades_label = Years
| colours     = Maroon, green, and charcoal 
| free_label  = Brother school 
| free_text   = Melbourne High School
| homepage      = 
| former_name   = Melbourne Continuation School
| oversight     = Victoria Department of Education
| nickname      = 
}}
The Mac.Robertson Girls' High School (also known simply as Mac.Rob or MGHS) is a government-funded single-sex academically selective secondary day school, located in the South Melbourne, Victoria, Australia. Entry for Mac.Rob, which is operated by the Victoria Department of Education, is by competitive academic examination. It is unique in its status as a statewide provider for girls in Year Nine to Year Twelve. The equivalent for boys is its brother school, Melbourne High School. Each year, over 3,000 candidates sit the entrance examination for a total of approximately 960 places (across all four schools).

Overview
In 2001, The Sun-Herald ranked the Mac.Robertson Girls' High School sixth in Australia's top ten girls' schools, based on the number of its alumnae mentioned in the Who's Who in Australia. The Mac.Robertson Girls' High School has a long tradition of academic excellence with Victorian Certificate of Education (VCE) scores propelling the school to be ranked first in the State of Victoria for seven consecutive years from 2002 to 2008, inclusive. The school was ranked third in 2009, but reclaimed its No. 1 ranking once again in 2010, 2011, 2013 and 2018. Mac.Robertson Girls' High School was ranked second out of all state secondary schools in Victoria based on VCE results in 2018.

History 
The Mac.Robertson Girls' High School began as Melbourne Continuation School, the first government funded secondary school in the state of Victoria, established in 1905 in Spring Street, Melbourne. In 1912, it was renamed Melbourne High School. Originally a co-educational school, the school was segregated by sexes in 1927, with the boys moving to Melbourne Boys' High School in Forrest Hill, South Yarra, Victoria. 

Girls continued to be educated in the school on Spring Street, renamed as Melbourne Girls' High School, until the building was condemned in 1930. The school was housed in the then-vacant Government House until 1933, when they moved to State School No. 1689 in King Street. In 1934, with the help of a donation from Macpherson Robertson, a new building was constructed the north-east corner of Albert Park Reserve. The school opened as the Mac.Robertson Girls' High School on 7 November 1934. The school was used as U.S Army Headquarters in 1942 and later by the R.A.A.F. The students took their classes at Brighton Road State School, Camberwell East Girls' School, and University High School during this period.

The building gained a national trust classification in 1987. It was previously gazetted as an Historic Building in 1982. The school celebrated its centenary year in 2005 with Melbourne High School in a joined assembly. Mac.Rob celebrated by inviting Premier of Victoria Steve Bracks to witness the restarting of the school clock tower (which coincidentally did not start when the time came).

In 2019, a burglar broke into Lakeside building and flooded the bottom floor, students then needed to walk to neighbouring schools to study because of the lack of space.

Past principals

Enrolment and structure 
The school operates in a two sub-school structure. The middle school caters for students in years 9 and 10, whilst the senior school caters for students in years 11 and 12. The school's enrolment across all four-year levels totals to approximately 950 to 980 students every year. The number of students taught at the school has increased over the last few years. In and prior to 2018, 225 students were admitted into year 9, with an extra class of 25 added in year 10. In 2019, the number of students in year 9 was changed to 250, with only a small number of students added in year 10 to bring the cohort back to 250 students after some left. In 2020, a quota of 300 year 9 students were selected for enrolment every year through the year 8 entrance examination. The size of the year 10-12 cohorts vary slightly each year, totalling between 230 and 260 students each year, including the intake of few students into Year 11.

Subjects 
In Year nine, students take core subjects including Maths, Foreign Language, English, Science, Physical Education and School Singing. Students with Geography and History alternating per semester. Students are also required to take two electives.

Year ten students take Mathematics, Foreign Language, and choose an English elective, P.E elective, Humanities elective, Science elective, Arts/Technology elective and/or an uncatergorised elective. Many electives are also available as VCE 1/2 subjects. Students must also continue education of a foreign language either in school or as an external subject. If a student chooses to learn language externally, they must choose an extra elective to study at school. 

Year eleven students may choose to study either VCE or IB. VCE students are required to take six year-long VCE/VET subjects, that may consist of maximum two 3/4 subjects. 

Year twelve students typically study four to six 3/4 subjects. Students usually cannot study more than a total of six 3/4 subjects across their VCE journey.

Houses 
The four houses and their associated colours are:
 Naiads, River Nymphs (Blue)
 Dryads, Tree Nymphs (Green)
 Nereids, Sea Nymphs (White)
 Oreads, Mountain Nymphs (Red)

Nereids official colour is white, although throughout the years it has come to adopt purple as its secondary colour.

Notable alumnae

Notable alumnae from the school include:
Alexandra Adornetto, author
Ellen Balaam, physician and first female surgeon in Victoria
Judith Buckrich, academic and author
Beatrice Faust (née Fennessy), author and feminist activist
Alice Garner, actress and academic
Antoinette Halloran, opera singer
Amirah Inglis, author
Tan Le, Young Australian of the Year
Seen Lee, weightlifter
Veronika Megler, computer scientist, data scientist and game developer
Alice Pung, author
Christina Twomey, historian
Priya Serrao, lawyer and Miss Universe Australia 2019
Dorothy Shineberg, historian
Renata Singer  (née Diamond), novelist and author, wife and collaborator of Peter Singer
Lili Wilkinson, author
Penny Wright, senator

See also 

 List of schools in Victoria, Australia
 MacRobertson Girls' High School buildings

References

External links 
 

Educational institutions established in 1905
Girls' schools in Victoria (Australia)
Selective schools in Victoria (Australia)
Public high schools in Melbourne
1905 establishments in Australia
Alliance of Girls' Schools Australasia
Buildings and structures in the City of Port Phillip